Das indische Grabmal ("the Indian tomb") is a 1918 novel by the German writer Thea von Harbou. It tells the story of a German architect who is commissioned by an Indian maharajah to create a large monument, only to learn that it is meant for the maharajah's unfaithful lover, who will be buried alive as punishment. The novel has been adapted for film three times, and was not translated into English until 2016.

Adaptations
A first film version directed by Joe May was released in 1921. It was released in two parts, titled The Indian Tomb with the subtitles The Mission of the Yogi and The Tiger of Eschnapur.  It starred Conrad Veidt and Mia May, the director's wife. A second German version was directed by Richard Eichberg and released in two parts in 1938 as The Tiger of Eschnapur and The Indian Tomb. Finally, von Harbou's ex-husband Fritz Lang directed a third German version also in two parts which premiered in 1959, also as The Tiger of Eschnapur and The Indian Tomb.

References

1918 German-language novels
German adventure novels
German novels adapted into films
1918 German novels
Novels by Thea von Harbou
Novels set in India